Piz San Jon is a mountain in the Sesvenna Range of the Alps, located south of Scuol in the canton of Graubünden. It is composed of three summits: Piz San Jon Dadaint (3,093 m), Piz San Jon d'Immez (3,065 m) and Piz San Jon Dadora (3,048 m). All are located on the range between the Val S-charl and the Val Lischana.

References

External links
 Piz San Jon on Hikr

Mountains of the Alps
Mountains of Graubünden
Mountains of Switzerland